The 2019 Serbia Open is the fourth event of the 2019 ITTF Challenge Series. It takes place from 3–5 May in Belgrade, Serbia.

Men's singles

Seeds

Draw

Top half

Section 1

Section 2

Bottom half

Section 3

Section 4

Finals

Women's singles

Seeds

Draw

Top half

Section 1

Section 2

Bottom half

Section 3

Section 4

Finals

Men's doubles

Seeds

Draw

Women's doubles

Seeds

Draw

References

External links
 Tournament page on ITTF website

Serbia Open
International sports competitions hosted by Serbia
Serbia Open